The former French Catholic diocese of Grasse was founded in the 4th or 5th century as the diocese of Antibes. It was originally suffragan to the Archbishop of Aix, and then to the Archbishop of Embrun. The see moved from Antibes to Grasse in 1244. It remained at Grasse Cathedral until the French Revolution. The diocese was suppressed by the Concordat of 1801, its territory passing to the diocese of Nice.

History

The city of Antibes was a colony of the Greek city of Massilia (Marseille). The Romans included it in the Alpes Maritimae. In church organization, Antibes belonged to the Province of Alpes Maritimae, whose Metropolitan was the Archbishop of Aix. Its Metropolitan later, before 1056, became the Archbishop of Embrun.

The first known Bishop of Antibes is Armentarius who attended the Council of Vaison in 442.

Louis Duchesne considered it possible that the Remigius, who signed at the Council of Nîmes in 396 and in 417 received a letter from Pope Zosimus, may have been Bishop of Antibes before Armentarius. Ralph Matheson, however, believes that this Remigius was Remigius of Aix.

On 19 July 1244, Pope Innocent IV transferred the seat of the diocese from the port city of Antibes to the interior city of Grasse, due to a depopulation of Antibes and the repeated attacks of pirates, propter insalubritatem aeris et incursus piratorum.

In 1181, King Idelfonso of Aragon granted Bishop Fulco of Antibes the seigneurial rights over the city of Antibes.

The cathedral of Grasse was dedicated to the Virgin Mary, and was supervised by a Chapter composed of (originally) five dignities (Provost, Sacristan, Archdeacon, 'capiscolo' [Scholasticus] and Archpriest) and four Canons (one of whom was designated the Theologus). The office of Provost, however, was abolished on 30 July 1692. The office of Archdeacon of Grasse was established by Bishop Bernardo de Castronovo on 16 May 1421.

The diocese of Grasse was suppressed by decree of the Legislative Assembly of France on 22 November 1790.

The arrondissement of Grasse was separated from the diocese of Fréjus in 1886, and given to the bishopric of Nice which since unites the three former Dioceses of Nice, Grasse and Vence.

Bishops of Antibes

c. 442: Armentarius
c. 506–c. 529: Agroecius
c. 529–541: Eucherius
 549 – 570  573: Eusebius
 c. 573 – c. 585: Optatus
 614: Eusebius
 c. 647–653: Deocarus
 788: Autbertus
 [828: Heldebonus]
 [930: Aimarus]
 c. 987 – 1022: Bernardus (I.)
 1026 – c. 1050: Heldebertus (I.)
 1056 – c. 1088: Gaufredus (I.)
 1089 – 1093: Aldebertus (or Adelbertus II.)
c. 1110 – c. 1135: Manfredus Grimaldi
 1143: Gaufredus (II.)
 1146–1156: Petrus
 1158–ca. 1165: Raimond (I.)
 1166–1177: Bertrandus (I.)
 1178–1185: Fulco
 1186–1187: Guillaume (I.)
 1188–c. 1195: Raimond (II.) Grimaldi
 1199: Olivier
c. 1208–c. 1211: Bertrandus (II.) 
 c. 1212–c. 1215: Guillaume (Gausselin) de Saint-Marcel
 1218–1245?: Bertrand d'Aix, O.P.

Bishops of Grasse

from 1245 to 1505

 1246–1253 Raimond (III.) Villeneuve, O.P.
 c. 1255 Pontius
 1258–1277 Guilelmus de Barras
 c. 1281 – 1286 Pons d'Arcussia
 1287–1298 Lantelmus de Saint-Marcel
 1298–1299 Guillaume Agarni
 1299–1343 Geoffroy (III.)
 1343–1348 Pierre de Béreste
 1348–1349 Jean Coci (Peyroleri)
 1349–1374 Amédée
 1374–1379 Aimar de La Voulte
 1379–1382 Artaud de Mélan
 1383–1388 Thomas de Jarente (Avignon Obedience)
 Mar–Oct 1389 Milon Provana, O.Min. (Avignon Obedience)
 9 Oct 1389 – 1392 Jacques Graillier
 29 February 1392 – 1407 Pierre Bonnet (Avignon Obedience)
 1408–1427 Bernard de Châteauneuf de Paule
 1427–1447 Antoine de Roumoules
 1448–1450 Guillaume Guezi
 1450–1451 Pierre de Forbin (Gorbin)
 1450 Dominique de Guiza
 1451–1483 Isnard de Grasse
 1483–1505 Jean-André Grimaldi

from 1505 to 1791

 1505–1532 Augustine Grimaldi
 1532–1533 René du Bellay
 1534–1536 Benoit Théocréne
 8 Jan 1537 – 18 March 1548 Agostino Trivulzio (Administrator)
 1551–1565 Jean Vallier
 1567–1570 Jean Grenon
 1570–1588 Étienne Déodel
 1588–1598 Georges de Poissieux
 1592–1601 Guillaume Le Blanc
 1604–1624 Étienne Le Maingre de Boucicault, O.F.M.Obs.
 1625–1628 Jean de Grasse-Cabris
 1630–1632 Jean Guérin
 1632–1636 Scipion de Villeneuve-Thorenc
 1636–1653 Antoine Godeau
 1653–1675 Louis de Bernage
 1676–1681 Louis Aube de Roquemartine
 1682–1683 Antoine Le Comte
[François Verjus]
[Jean Balthazar de Cabanes]
 1692–1710 François Verjus
 1711–1726 Joseph de Mesgrigny, O.F.M. Cap.
 1726–1752 Charles-Octavien d'Anthelmy
 1752–1797 François d'Estienne de Saint-Jean de Prunières

See also
 Catholic Church in France
 List of Catholic dioceses in France

References

Bibliography

Reference works
  (Use with caution; obsolete)
  (in Latin) 
 (in Latin)

Studies

Bianchi, Constant. "L'application de la Constitution civile du clergé dans l'ancien diocèse de Grasse," Annales de la Société scientifique et littéraire de Cannes, 13 (1951–54), pp. 97–108.

 Downloadable from Hathi Trust.

Acknowledgment

Former Roman Catholic dioceses in France
Dioceses established in the 4th century
Religious organizations established in the 1240s
Roman Catholic Diocese of Grasse
1244 establishments in Europe
1240s establishments in France
1801 disestablishments in France
Roman Catholic dioceses established in the 13th century